Eslamabad (also Romanized as Eslāmābād; also known as Eslāmābād-e Pā’īn) is a village in Golidagh Rural District, Golidagh District, Maraveh Tappeh County, Golestan Province, Iran. At the 2006 census, its population was 776, in 167 families.

References 

Populated places in Maraveh Tappeh County